Lolésio Tuita (15 July 1943 – 15 December 1994) was a French javelin thrower who competed in the 1972 Summer Olympics.

Achievements

References

External links
 

1943 births
1994 deaths
Olympic athletes of France
Athletes (track and field) at the 1972 Summer Olympics
French male javelin throwers
Wallis and Futuna javelin throwers
Wallis and Futuna shot putters